Anna Lambe is a Canadian Inuk actress from Iqaluit, Nunavut. She is most noted for her debut role as Spring in the 2018 film The Grizzlies, for which she received a Canadian Screen Award nomination for Best Supporting Actress at the 7th Canadian Screen Awards in 2019.

Career
Lambe made her film debut in the 2018 film The Grizzlies, based on a real-life story, as Wynter Kuliktana Blais. She was encouraged to audition for the role by her drama teacher. The film was shot in Iqaluit, Lambe's hometown. The film was met with critical acclaim, and Lambe was nominated for Best Supporting Actress at the 7th Canadian Screen Awards for her performance.

In 2020, she had a supporting role as Sarah in the television series Trickster. At the 9th Canadian Screen Awards in 2021, she received a nomination for Best Supporting Actress in a Drama Series.

Personal life
Lambe studies International Development and Globalization at the University of Ottawa.

In 2020 she wrote an open letter calling for the Legislative Assembly of Nunavut to censure MLA Cathy Towtongie, following Towtongie's statement objecting to the use of the word two-spirit in a legislative motion on the grounds that the concept was not a part of Inuit culture. She wrote that "as Inuit, we pride ourselves on being a tolerant, accepting people… Cathy Towtongie does not speak for me as an Inuk in claiming two-spirit lives are not the Inuit way. Sexual fluidity and gender fluidity are parts of Inuit history that have been shamed, lost and only now are we again hearing stories of our ancestors that did not stigmatize gender and sexual identities… I strongly urge the legislative assembly of Nunavut to re-evaluate its values and beliefs in representing Nunavummiut in a fair and just manner."

References

External links

Canadian television actresses
Canadian film actresses
Actresses from Nunavut
Inuit actresses
Living people
Canadian child actresses
Year of birth missing (living people)
21st-century Canadian actresses
People from Iqaluit
Canadian LGBT rights activists